There and Back Again, by Max Merriwell is a 1999 science fiction novel by Pat Murphy, retelling J.R.R. Tolkien's The Hobbit as a space opera, combined with Lewis Carroll's The Hunting of the Snark. It was published by Tor Books.

Murphy has described it as "both an enormous joke and a serious meta-fictional experiment", with "Max Merriwell" being a science-fiction author who exists in an alternate reality, and whose writing is different from Murphy's own; the book is the first in a series of three novels which are all purportedly written by "Merriwell" under various pseudonyms.

Synopsis

When asteroid-dwelling "norbit" Bailey Beldon discovers a lost message beacon, it leads Gitana the pataphysicist to recruit him for a grand adventure that takes him far from home.

Reception

The Japanese-language version of There and Back Again won the 2002 Seiun Award for Best Translated Novel.

The New York Times described it as a "delight", lauding Murphy's "deceptively casual Tolkienesque prose" and noting her allusions to Alfred Jarry, and proposed that it would serve as an "entertaining romp" even for readers unfamiliar with the source material. Publishers Weekly was less favorable, calling it "disappointing", with insufficient divergence from the source material to compensate for its "recognizability — and thus predictability", and ultimately judging it as "what it purports to be: a second-rate space opera".

John Clute critiqued the book's overall positivity, observing that Murphy's equivalent to the One Ring has no moral cost, and stating that although "The Hobbit is both sombre and hilarious (...) There and Back Again is neither;" he also questioned her choice to integrate elements of Carroll, which he described as thematically incompatible with Tolkien. James Nicoll, conversely, observed that "Bailey lives (in) a brighter universe than Bilbo, one where the idea of a happy ending is not a sad joke", and emphasized that the text is not a "thumb-fingered one-to-one mapping of a fantasy onto a science fiction setting".

Legal issues

The literary estate of J.R.R. Tolkien has declared that There and Back Again is an infringement upon their rights to The Hobbit; Murphy has stated that, although she disagrees, and considers it to be a transformative work of feminist commentary, the book's publication has been discontinued so as to obviate further dispute.

References

External links
October 2000 conference with Pat Murphy on The WELL, in which Murphy discusses the process of writing There and Back Again
Borrow-able copy at OpenLibrary

1999 science fiction novels
Adaptations of works by Lewis Carroll
Novels based on novels
Novels based on poems
Works based on The Hobbit
Works by Pat Murphy (writer)